The Rise of Exotic Computing is a composition for sinfonietta and electronica by the American composer Mason Bates.  The work was commissioned by the Pittsburgh Symphony Orchestra and was premiered by the orchestra April 5, 2013.

Composition
The Rise of Exotic Computing is composed in a single movement and has a duration of roughly 12 minutes.  The music critic Mark Kanny wrote, "The piece was inspired by the idea of synthetic computing – computers generating their own ideas."

Instrumentation
The work is scored for electronica and a sinfonietta comprising flute, oboe, clarinet, bassoon, French horn, trumpet, percussion, harp, piano, two violins, viola, cello, and double bass.

Reception
Mark Kanny of the Pittsburgh Tribune-Review lauded the piece, writing, "Bates runs with it by using short motifs, which jump from instrument to instrument. Some ideas bring minimalism to mind, but Bates' musical thinking is far more playful and engaging."  John von Rhein of the Chicago Tribune wrote:
Conversely, Elizabeth Bloom of the Pittsburgh Post-Gazette was more critical of the work, calling it a "repetitive, thin piece" that "did not translate well in the concert hall."  Lawrence A. Johnson of the Chicago Classical Review similarly admonished, "Overscored and overamped, I found Exotic Computing empty, noisy, and something of a scam."

References

Compositions by Mason Bates
2013 compositions
Compositions for chamber orchestra
Music commissioned by the Pittsburgh Symphony Orchestra